Cuniculina cunicula is a species of phasmid or stick insect of the genus Cuniculina. It is found in India and Sri Lanka.

References

Phasmatidae
Insects of Asia
Insects described in 1859